Carla Perez may refer to:
Carla Pérez (born 1982), Ecuadorian mountaineer and climber
Carla Perez (actress) (born 1977), Brazilian singer, dancer, television presenter, and actress
Carla Perez (actress, born 1970), Filipina-American actress known for playing Rita Repulsa in Mighty Morphin Power Rangers
Carla Pérez (actress, born 1978), Spanish actress known for the 2015 film The Gunman

See also
Carola Pérez (born 1978), Spanish medical cannabis patient and manager of the International Association for Cannabinoid Medicines patient council